James Halliburton Haig (1876–1943) was a Scottish footballer who played in the Football League for Chesterfield Town and Derby County.

References

1876 births
1943 deaths
Scottish footballers
Association football midfielders
English Football League players
St Mirren F.C. players
Derby County F.C. players
Chesterfield F.C. players